Ti rincontrerò is the first solo studio album by Italian singer Marco Carta. It was released on June 13, 2008.

Track listing
Per sempre
Anima di nuvola
Un grande libro nuovo
Ti rincontrerò
A chi (Hurt)
E tu
Ti pretendo
Cielo nel cielo
La donna cannone
Vita (duet with Luca Jurman)

Charts

References

2008 debut albums